Volker Zerbe (born 30 June 1968) is a former German team handball player and current club manager. He received a silver medal at the 2004 Summer Olympics in Athens with the German national team. He is European champion from 2004.

References

1968 births
Living people
German male handball players
Olympic handball players of Germany
Handball players at the 1992 Summer Olympics
Handball players at the 1996 Summer Olympics
Handball players at the 2000 Summer Olympics
Handball players at the 2004 Summer Olympics
Olympic silver medalists for Germany
Olympic medalists in handball
Medalists at the 2004 Summer Olympics